Charge It is a 1921 American silent drama film directed by Harry Garson and starring Clara Kimball Young.

Cast
Clara Kimball Young - Julia Lawrence
Herbert Rawlinson - Philip Lawrence
Edward M. Kimball - Tom Garreth
Betty Blythe - Mille Garreth
Nigel Barrie - Dana Herrick
Hal Wilson - Robert McGregor
Dulcie Cooper - Rose McGregor

Preservation status
A copy is preserved in the UCLA Film and Television Archive.

References

External links
 Charge It at IMDb.com

1921 films
American silent feature films
Films based on short fiction
American black-and-white films
Silent American drama films
1921 drama films
Films directed by Harry Garson
1920s American films